The World Junior Alpine Skiing Championships 2011 were the 30th World Junior Alpine Skiing Championships, held between 30 January and 5 February 2011 in Crans-Montana, Switzerland.

Medal winners

Men's events

Women's events

External links
World Junior Alpine Skiing Championships 2011 results at fis-ski.com

World Junior Alpine Skiing Championships
2011 in alpine skiing
Alpine skiing competitions in Switzerland
2011 in Swiss sport